The Format is an American indie rock band formed by Nate Ruess and Sam Means. Their style can be considered a mixture of indie, alternative, punk and folk music, with elements of 1960s and 1970s pop music. Though Means and Ruess are the foremost members of the band, they have played, toured, and recorded with Mike Schey, Mark Buzard, Don Raymond, and for the DVD recording and summer 2007 tour, The Honorary Title's drummer Adam Boyd. The Format chose their name to make fun of the music industry's inclination towards a cookie-cutter "format" for a hit. Formed in 2002, the band announced a hiatus on February 4, 2008. On February 4, 2020, they announced a return from their hiatus for a tour of special shows that were later cancelled due to the pandemic.

History

Before forming The Format in February 2002, Means and Ruess, who had been friends since grade school, formed the band Nevergonnascore and released the EP "The Byron Sessions" which had generated some record label interest but not a deal.

The duo's first single, aptly titled "The First Single" from their five-song demo, EP, became locally popular on Phoenix radio station KEDJ and led to the duo signing with Elektra Records in 2002.  Their first studio album, Interventions + Lullabies, recorded and produced by R. Walt Vincent and released in October 2003, was very successful around the Phoenix area. The band's fan base grew due to word of mouth, the Internet, and extensive touring. The album sold over 100,000 copies in the US.
l
After Elektra folded, The Format released a second EP, Snails, with sister label Atlantic Records in April 2005. As they began to work on their second full-length album, they drew on the influences of 1970s pop music, including Harry Nilsson, Electric Light Orchestra and The Beach Boys, and decided to collaborate with Redd Kross founder Steven Shane McDonald whom they brought on as record producer. But Atlantic Records executives were not impressed by the 1970s-pop-influenced demos and released The Format from its contract. Upon completing the album, Dog Problems, Ruess and Means, with help from their management company, decided to release it themselves through their newly established imprint label: The Vanity Label. Two months prior to the album's release, an MP3 version was leaked to the internet. In response, The Format decided to make the album immediately available digitally for only $7.99 via the Nettwerk Music Store, which led to the sale of over 2,000 digital copies prior to the album's official release. Dog Problems was released in stores on July 11, 2006. The day the album was released, an episode of MTV's My Super Sweet 16 featuring The Format aired, on which they performed at a birthday-graduation party for Priya and Divya Kothapalli from Nederland, Texas.

Following the release of Dog Problems, The Format gained more attention, receiving high marks from various publications, even topping some Best of 2006 lists. During this year, The Format toured near constantly, supporting their own album Dog Problems as well as supporting The All American Rejects in September in the UK.

In 2007, The Format played a show in Tokyo, Japan, were featured on Last Call with Carson Daly twice, co-headlined with Guster on their Campus Consciousness tour, and toured with Reubens Accomplice, Piebald, Limbeck, Steel Train, and The Honorary Title.

On June 25, 2007, celebrating the one-year anniversary of Dog Problems, The Format offered the album in its entirety, including the liner notes in PDF form, for free on their official website. The offer was valid from June 25 to July 16, 2007. As of July 10, 2007, 36,000 people had downloaded the album.

On February 4, 2008, The Format announced that they would be putting the band on hiatus, with Nate Ruess posting the following message on the band's website:

Means has completed solo work, including scoring the soundtrack to the film The Sinking of Santa Isabel, as well as forming Destry with former Straylight Run singer Michelle DaRosa.

When asked about the band getting back together, Ruess acknowledged that "every one of us like to remain optimistic and hopeful that it one day could happen."

Following The Format's 2008 breakup, Ruess joined with Andrew Dost of Anathallo and Jack Antonoff of Steel Train to form Fun, a band that has gone on to more commercial success than any of its associated former acts, with the pop hits "We Are Young" and "Some Nights" becoming some of the most popular songs of 2012. Fun began recording their debut album, Aim and Ignite, in September 2008 with producer Steven Shane McDonald and arranger Roger Joseph Manning Jr.; it was released on August 25, 2009.

On February 3, 2020, the band formally re-released their 2007 concert film Live At The Mayan to streaming services and vinyl (previously only available on DVD.) The band also reunited for a live screening of the film and their first acoustic concert in over 12 years. The next day, the band announced a reunion in the spring of 2020 with concerts in Chicago, New York, and Phoenix.

In March 2020, their tour (originally scheduled for March and April 2020) was postponed to July 2020 due to the COVID-19 pandemic. In June 2020, it was postponed again to July 2021. After a third postponement to March and April 2022, the tour was ultimately cancelled.

Discography

Studio albums
Interventions + Lullabies (2003)
Dog Problems (2006)

Compilations
Live at the Mesa Amphitheater (Limited Release live album, 2004)
B-Sides & Rarities (The Vanity Label, 2007)
Live at the Mayan Theatre (The Vanity Label, recorded 2007, released 2020)

EPs
EP (self-released, 2002)
Snails (Atlantic, 2005)
Live from the Living Room: Volume One (The Vanity Label, 2006)
And Now I Hope You're Alright - Live in California (The Vanity Label, 2006)
The Format Live: Exporting Insecurity (The Vanity Label, 2006)
Kenneth Room Sessions (The Vanity Label, 2016)

DVD
Live at the Mayan Theatre (The Vanity Label, 2007)

Singles
"The First Single" (Elektra, 2003)
"The Compromise" (The Vanity Label, 2006)
"Time Bomb" (The Vanity Label, 2006)
"Apeman" (The Vanity Label, 2006)
"She Doesn't Get It" (The Vanity Label, 2006)
"Dog Problems" (The Vanity Label, 2006)
"Swans" (The Vanity Label, 2016)
”Your New Name” (The Vanity Label, 2022)

Other songs
"Swans" was written especially for the film Moving McAllister.
Listen To Bob Dylan: A Tribute (Drive-Thru, 2005) - "Simple Twist of Fate"
Acoustic Live & Rare 2006 & Last Character Standing, Vol. V (The Edge 103.9 fm) - "The Compromise (Acoustic)"
A Santa Cause: It's a Punk Rock Christmas (Immortal Records, Vol 2: December 5, 2006) - "Holly Jolly Christmas"
Phoenix: We Love It - "Yeah Yeah"

References

External links
Official site
Western Tread
The Format's LiveJournal Site
Interview with LAist
Interview with Synergy Magazine
'Oceans' live video on Tub-O-Popcorn
Interview with The Marketing Fresh Peel
Interview from Hate Something Beautiful (2005)

Indie rock musical groups from Arizona
American indie pop groups
Atlantic Records artists
Elektra Records artists
Musical groups established in 2002
Musical groups disestablished in 2008
Musical groups reestablished in 2020